Crawford Grimsley (born October 1, 1967) is a retired professional heavyweight boxer and kickboxer, who fought several significant fighters of his era. He challenged once for the lineal, WBU and vacant IBA heavyweight titles in 1996, and once for the IBO heavyweight title in 1997.

Professional career
He made his professional debut in 1994, stopping Steve Paolilli in the first round. His most notable match was against Jimmy Thunder. In 1.5 seconds, Thunder delivered a right hook to the head and Grimsley hit the mat and the match ended. This match serves as the fastest boxing match in history. Before the fight, Grimsley had a 20-1 record with 18 wins by KO and his sole loss being a twelve-round decision to George Foreman four months prior. He retired in 2002.

Personal life
After his boxing career he founded ProWebCast, one of the first webcasting companies, in the 1990s before entering the cannabis industry and becoming CEO of Cannabis Consulting Group Inc.

Professional boxing record

|-
|align="center" colspan=8|22 Wins (20 knockouts, 2 decisions), 4 Losses (3 knockouts, 1 decision), 1 Draw 
|-
| align="center" style="border-style: none none solid solid; background: #e3e3e3"|Result
| align="center" style="border-style: none none solid solid; background: #e3e3e3"|Record
| align="center" style="border-style: none none solid solid; background: #e3e3e3"|Opponent
| align="center" style="border-style: none none solid solid; background: #e3e3e3"|Type
| align="center" style="border-style: none none solid solid; background: #e3e3e3"|Round
| align="center" style="border-style: none none solid solid; background: #e3e3e3"|Date
| align="center" style="border-style: none none solid solid; background: #e3e3e3"|Location
| align="center" style="border-style: none none solid solid; background: #e3e3e3"|Notes
|-align=center
|Loss
|22–4–1
|align=left| Andre Purlette
|TKO
|3 
|07/09/2002
|align=left| Kongresovy Sal, Prague, Czech Republic
|align=left|For WBC Latino heavyweight title
|-align=center
|style="background:#abcdef;"|Draw
|22–3–1
|align=left| Nick Nurse
|TD
|3 
|05/10/2001
|align=left| Level Nightclub, Miami Beach, Florida, United States
|align=left|
|-align=center
|Win
|22–3
|align=left| Tommy Mucciogrosso
|TKO
|2 
|10/07/1998
|align=left| Memorial Auditorium, Fort Lauderdale, Florida, US
|align=left|
|-align=center
|Win
|21–3
|align=left| Isaac Poole
|TKO
|2 
|06/12/1997
|align=left| Oranjestad, Aruba
|align=left|
|-align=center
|Loss
|20–3
|align=left| Brian Nielsen
|TKO
|6 
|03/10/1997
|align=left| Ostre Gasvaerk, Copenhagen, Denmark
|align=left|
|-align=center
|Loss
|20–2
|align=left| Jimmy Thunder
|KO
|1 
|18/03/1997
|align=left| IMA Center, Flint, Michigan, United States
|align=left|
|-align=center
|Loss
|20–1
|align=left| George Foreman
|UD
|12
|03/11/1996
|align=left| Tokyo Bay NK Hall, Urayasu, Chiba, Japan
|align=left|
|-align=center
|Win
|20–0
|align=left| Eddie Curry
|TKO
|1 
|23/03/1996
|align=left| Miami Arena, Miami, Florida, United States
|align=left|
|-align=center
|Win
|19–0
|align=left| Carlton West
|KO
|1 
|20/01/1996
|align=left| Miami, Florida, United States
|align=left|
|-align=center
|Win
|18–0
|align=left| Ron McGowan
|TKO
|6 
|02/12/1995
|align=left| Miami, Florida, United States
|align=left|
|-align=center
|Win
|17–0
|align=left| John Morton
|TKO
|2 
|15/11/1995
|align=left| Condado, Puerto Rico
|align=left|
|-align=center
|Win
|16–0
|align=left| Max Key
|TKO
|1 
|04/10/1995
|align=left| Condado, Puerto Rico
|align=left|
|-align=center
|Win
|15–0
|align=left| Ladislao Mijangos
|KO
|1 
|18/09/1995
|align=left| Condado, Venezuela
|align=left|
|-align=center
|Win
|14–0
|align=left| Chris Cole
|TKO
|1 
|29/07/1995
|align=left| Miami, Florida, United States
|align=left|
|-align=center
|Win
|13–0
|align=left| Mike Faulkner
|KO
|1 
|08/07/1995
|align=left| Miami, Florida, United States
|align=left|
|-align=center
|Win
|12–0
|align=left| Charles Hostetter
|KO
|1 
|15/04/1995
|align=left| Miami, Florida, United States
|align=left|
|-align=center
|Win
|11–0
|align=left| Charles Hostetter
|PTS
|8
|11/02/1995
|align=left| Miami, Florida, United States
|align=left|
|-align=center
|Win
|10–0
|align=left| Perfecto Gonzalez
|KO
|3 
|25/11/1994
|align=left| Santo Domingo, Dominican Republic
|align=left|
|-align=center
|Win
|9–0
|align=left| Ron Gullette
|PTS
|6
|22/10/1994
|align=left| Miami, Florida, United States
|align=left|
|-align=center
|Win
|8–0
|align=left| Charles Dixon
|KO
|3 
|23/09/1994
|align=left| Maracay, Venezuela
|align=left|
|-align=center
|Win
|7–0
|align=left| Alvin Dominey
|KO
|1 
|10/09/1994
|align=left| Miami, Florida, United States
|align=left|
|-align=center
|Win
|6–0
|align=left| Isaac Poole
|KO
|1 
|27/08/1994
|align=left| Miami Beach, Florida, United States
|align=left|
|-align=center
|Win
|5–0
|align=left| Ed Irving
|KO
|1 
|13/08/1994
|align=left| Miami, Florida, United States
|align=left|
|-align=center
|Win
|4–0
|align=left|Akili Muhammad
|KO
|1 
|11/06/1994
|align=left| Miami, Florida, United States
|align=left|
|-align=center
|Win
|3–0
|align=left| Tom Bersaw
|KO
|1 
|14/05/1994
|align=left| Miami, Florida, United States
|align=left|
|-align=center
|Win
|2–0
|align=left| Juan Guerra
|TKO
|1 
|02/04/1994
|align=left| Miami, Florida, United States
|align=left|
|-align=center
|Win
|1–0
|align=left| Steve Paolilli
|TKO
|1 
|05/02/1994
|align=left| Miami, Florida, United States
|align=left|
|-align=center

References

External links
 

Heavyweight boxers
1967 births
Living people
Heavyweight kickboxers
American male boxers
American male kickboxers